Ultra-processed foods, also referred to as ultra-processed food products (UPP), are food and drink products that have undergone specified types of food processing, usually by transnational and other very large 'Big food' corporations. These foods are designed to be "convenient, eaten on the go, hyperpalatable and appealing to consumers, and, most importantly, the most profitable segment of Big food companies' portfolios because of these foods' low-cost ingredients".

Ultra-processed foods are connected to obesity, other health issues, food access and insecurity issues and contributes to some of the other environmental impacts of industrial agriculture. Some countries have begun regulating ultraprocessed foods through labeling and restrictions on their sale.

Definition 
The concept of ultra-processed food was initially developed and the term coined by the Brazilian nutrition researcher Carlos Monteiro, with his team at the Center for Epidemiological Research in Nutrition and Health (NUPENS) at the University of São Paulo, Brazil. They argue that "the issue is not food, nor nutrients, so much as processing," and "from the point of view of human health, at present, the most salient division of food and drinks is in terms of their type, degree, and purpose of processing."

Specifications and definitions of ultra-processed foods are available in reports published by United Nations agencies, most recently in 2019, in the literature, in the Open Food Facts database, and in the media.

They include:

 Carbonated soft drinks, such as Pepsi and Coca-Cola
 Sweet, fatty or salty packaged snacks, such as Cheetos and potato chips
 Candies (confectionery), such as Snickers and Butterfinger
 Mass-produced packaged breads and buns, such as Wonder Bread and other White bread
 Cookies (biscuits), such as Oreo
 Pastries, such as Pepperidge Farm and Franz Family Bakeries
 Cakes and cake mixes, such as Duncan Hines and Pillsbury
 Margarine and other spreads, such as Smart Balance and I Can't Believe It's Not Butter!
 Sweetened breakfast cereals, such as Cocoa Puffs and Lucky Charms
 Sweetened fruit yoghurt and energy drinks, such as Go-Gurt and Monster Energy
 Powdered and packaged instant soups, noodles, and desserts, such as Cup Noodles and Campbell's Soup Company
 Pre-prepared meat, cheese, pasta and pizza dishes, such as Ball Park Franks and Jimmy Dean (brand)
 Poultry and fish nuggets and sticks, such as Tyson Foods and McDonald's
 Sausages, burgers, hot dogs, and other reconstituted meat products, such as Spam and Slim Jim (snack food)  l

NOVA food classification
The NOVA (a name, not an acronym) food classification system is based on the nature, extent and purpose of industrial food processing. The groups are:

 Unprocessed or minimally processed foods
 Processed culinary ingredients
 Processed foods
 Ultra processed food and drink products

Processing as such is essential, and virtually all food is processed in some way. The term ultra-processing refers to the processing of industrial ingredients derived from foods, for example by extruding, moulding, re-shaping, hydrogenation, and hydrolysis. Ultra-processed foods generally also include additives such as preservatives, sweeteners, sensory enhancers, colourants, flavours, and processing aids, but little or no whole food. They may be fortified with micronutrients. The aim is to create durable, convenient and palatable ready-to-eat or ready-to-heat food products suitable to be consumed as snacks or to replace freshly-prepared food-based dishes and meals.

Economics 
Ultra-processed foods are an important part of food corporation portfolios because they rely on low cost ingredients and often enjoy higher profit margins.

They are designed for broad consumer appeal. While instant noodles are often used as a base carbohydrate in regular meals, many ultra-processed foods are often discretionary foods, for snacking between meals. Ultra-processed foods typically benefit from extended shelf life, an important consideration for lower income consumers without reliable access to refrigeration. Among other reasons for the popularity of ultra-processed foods are the inexpensive cost of their main ingredients and aggressive marketing, especially toward youth consumers and particularly in middle income countries.

A report from Global Health Advocacy Incubator documents the food industry’s strategies to defeat warning labels on ultra-processed food products (UPP).

Impacts 
Epidemiological studies published since 2012 carried out in countries including Brazil, Chile, Colombia, Mexico, the USA, Canada, the UK, France, Spain, Australia, and Taiwan consistently show that increasing or high consumption of ultra-processed food is associated with reduction of diet quality or increased incidence variously of obesity or chronic non-communicable conditions and diseases such as diabetes, hypertension, heart disease, some cancers, and with earlier mortality. A randomised controlled trial carried out by researchers from the US National Institutes of Health published in 2019 has found that consumption of ultra-processed foods causes increased energy intake and increased fat and total body weight.

Four Latin American countries—Brazil, Uruguay, Peru, and Ecuador—have so far published national official dietary guidelines that recommend avoiding ultra-processed foods. Ultra-processed foods are identified as harmful to health in a 2019 official government report from France and as published in 2020 by the World Bank.

Ultra-processed foods have higher environmental impacts than fresh foods.

Appraisals 
The utility of the NOVA classification and its concept of ultra-processing has been subject to criticism. Most published criticisms of NOVA has come from authors associated in some way with the manufacturers of ultra-processed food, their representative organisations, or organisations they support. A 2018 BMJ editorial comments: Ultra-processed foods is a broad (and potentially rapidly changing) food category that includes multiple foods prepared by a variety of methods and containing a myriad of nutrients and food additivesA 2019 report published by the UN Food and Agriculture Organization concludes in part: "More epidemiological research is especially needed on the impact of ultra-processed food intake on the health and well-being of infants, children and adolescents including its effects on both diet-related chronic NCDs and also on undernutrition and micronutrient deficiencies. More cohort studies on obesity, diabetes, cardiovascular diseases, various types of cancer and other diseases will enable meta-analyses of their association with ultra-processed food intake and estimation of disease-specific pooled relative risks."

Independent assessments generally conclude that further research should guide public policies and actions, and not delay them. Such actions should include statutory—including fiscal—measures designed to make unprocessed and less processed food more available and affordable, to encourage consumption of freshly-prepared meals, to eliminate all subsidies and price support schemes that make ultra-processed food artificially cheap, and to regulate and restrict its manufacture and marketing.

Media coverage 
A French longitudinal study from the Nutri Net Santé group published in 2018 showing a correlation between ultra-processed food and cancer risk prompted some media outlets to run alarmist headlines claiming that eating such food may raise cancer risk, or does raise risk—these headlines were based on a common misunderstanding between correlation and causation.

Media coverage of ultra-processed food, and ultra-processing and the NOVA food classification generally has been very extensive since publication beginning in 2018 of a series of French studies undertaken by the Nutri Net Santé group, and publication in 2019 of the US National Institutes of Health randomised controlled trial of ultra-processed food and increases in body weight and fat. This includes briefings from scientific centres and expert organisations, reports in many countries on television and radio, newspapers and magazines, videos, podcasts, blogs, and commentary on the internet, some of which has been summarised and quoted.

As reported on US National Public Radio and in the New York Times, senior US researchers were impressed by the National Institutes of Health study. Dariush Mozaffarian, Dean of Tufts University's Friedman School of Nutrition Science and Policy, said: "These are landmark findings, that processing of foods makes a huge difference in how much a person eats". Barry Popkin, of the University of North Carolina at Chapel Hill, who like Dariush Mozaffarian was not involved in the NIH study, said: "The difference in weight gain for one group and weight loss for the other during these two periods is phenomenal. This is a very important study and a major challenge to the global food industry and the food science profession".

References

Further reading
 Lustig, Robert H. Fat Chance: Beating the Odds Against Sugar, Processed Food, Obesity, and Disease. 2012.
 Monteiro CA, Cannon G, Levy RB et al. NOVA. The star shines bright. [Food classification. Public health] World Nutrition. January-March 2016, 7,1-3, 28-38

See also 
 Consumer Goods Forum
 Food marketing
 Food politics
 Epidemiology of obesity
 Junk food

Food processing